Sayed Zulfikar Abbas Bukhari (born 3 December 1980), also known as Zulfi Bukhari, is a Pakistani multi-millionaire businessman, politician and film producer.

He served as a Special Assistant to Prime Minister Imran Khan in the capacity of a Minister of State in Cabinet until his resignation on 17 May 2021 over the allegations levelled at him in regards to the Rawalpindi Ring Road scandal.

Family 
Sayed Zulfikar Abbas Bukhari is a British-born Pakistani politician and entrepreneur; born on 3 December 1980. He is popularly known as Zulfi Bukhari. He was a member of Pakistan's Federal Cabinet as Special Assistant to Prime Minister Imran Khan on Overseas Pakistanis & Human Resource Development. He was also appointed Chairman of National Tourism Coordination Board, Pakistan. He belongs to Pakistan’s ruling party Pakistan Tehreek-e-Insaf (PTI). On 17 May 2021, he resigned from his post of Special Assistant to Prime Minister over the allegations of Rawalpindi Ring Road scandal.

His family roots lie in Attock, Punjab, and his father Wajid Hussain Bukhari served as environment minister in Pervez Musharraf’s cabinet while his uncle Ejaz Hussain Bukhari is an important PTI politician in Attock.

Business career 
Zulfi Bukhari is a business tycoon, owns a number of properties in UK and founder of many companies including UK based luxury real-estate business HPM Developments established in 2011. He is also the founder of Hooks Gym & Martin-Kemp Design, a leading London-based design studio, producing bespoke luxury solutions ranging from interiors, architectural design to yachts and private jets.

Among these companies is HPM Developments, which was dissolved under an Insolvency Proceeding in 2020 in London.

Politics 
He is an active member of Pakistan Tehreek-e-Insaf and a close aid to the Prime Minister of Pakistan Imran Khan since 2011. In 2018, Bukhari was head of Imran Khan's campaign in NA-53 (Islamabad-II). After the 2018 election victory, Imran Khan announced his cabinet and Bukhari was appointed as a Minister of State. He held the following offices:

 Special Assistant to PM on Overseas Pakistanis and Human Resource Development
 Chairman Pakistan Tourism Development Corporation
 Chairman of National Tourism Coordination Board

Controversies 
Zulfi Bukhari resigned from his office as Special Assistant to the Prime Minister on OPHRD in a tweet on 17 May 2021. He quoted reasons as taking high moral approach as his name had been hinted at in a controversial report unveiled by the government of Pakistan. The allegation came on him for misuse of power owing to his relationship with Dr. Syed Tauqir Bukhari who had been named in the report. He denied any connection as his family is not even on talking terms with Dr Tauqir, he asked for his name to be placed  on ECL if need arises. He also declared that he has no role in the alleged ring road scam. Later Federal Aviation Minister Ghulam Sarwar Khan announced on 18 June 2021 that his resignation had not been accepted by the Prime Minister.

On 3rd September 2022, he renounced his British Nationality.

Film production 
He has interests in film production. He was the executive producer of the 2018 movie Cake, selected as Pakistan’s entry for the Best Foreign Language Film at the 91st Academy Awards.

This was the first Pakistani movie to receive a full red carpet premier in London’s Leicester Square. Cake both challenged the Western perceptions of Pakistani film and stimulated the cultural economy whilst proudly showcasing Pakistani talent to an international audience. Cake was named as Pakistan’s official entry for the Foreign Language Film at the following Academy Awards following critical acclaim and box office success in September 2018.

Media image 
He was featured in May 2018 by The Muslim 100 Power List, which honours the most powerful and influential Muslims for the very highest level of achievement within the international Muslim community and positively promotes the outstanding contribution made by Muslim men and women on the local, national and international stage. Zulfikar, was acknowledged as one of The Most Influential Trailblazers in Britain Today, others on the list were London's Mayor Sadiq Khan.

He is the first Pakistani to appear on the cover of the Mayfair Times.

The UK-based entertainment and lifestyle magazine Asian Style Magazine has described him as one of South Asia’s five best dressed men in 2020.

He also made the cover of the December 2020 edition of HELLO! Pakistan, the country’s best selling fashion and lifestyle magazine.

External links 
 National Assembly of Pakistan
 Ministry of Overseas Pakistanis and Human Resource Development
Asian Express Newspaper - Meet the man determined to help change the face of Pakistan
PM Imran approves National Tourism Coordination Board
 Govt appoints Zulfi as acting chairman of tourism board
 Pakpedia profile
 Ministry of Information and Broadcasting
 Pakistan Tourism Development Corporation
 Eyebrows raised over Zulfi’s appointment
 Zulfi Bukhari admits being UK citizen by birth
 Zulfi Bukhari appointed chairman of Pakistan Tourism Development Corporation

References 

 Asian Express Newspaper - Meet the man determined to help change the face of Pakistan

1980 births
British politicians of Pakistani descent
Living people
Imran Khan administration
British emigrants to Pakistan